Cul De Sac East was a settlement in Newfoundland and Labrador.

See also
List of ghost towns in Newfoundland and Labrador

Ghost towns in Newfoundland and Labrador